Nationwide may refer to:

Organisations
 Nationwide Building Society, a UK building society
 Nationwide Mutual Insurance Company, an insurance company based in Columbus, Ohio, US
 Nationwide Asset Services, a debt settlement company in the US
 Nationwide Airlines (disambiguation), several airlines

Sport
 Nationwide Series, or Nationwide formerly the Busch Series and now Xfinity Series, was an auto race series sponsored by the Nationwide Mutual Insurance Company
 Nationwide Championship, (1991–2000), a golf tournament in Georgia, US
 Nationwide Tour (2003–2011), the former name of a second-tier men's golf tour
 English Football League, formerly called the Nationwide League
 Kenyan Nationwide League, a league below the top tier of Kenyan football

TV programmes
 Nationwide (TV programme), a British current affairs series (1969–1983)
 Nationwide (Australian TV programme), a current affairs programme (1979–1984)
 Nationwide (Irish TV programme), a regional news programm

Music
 Nationwide (album) (1990), a noise rock album by Surgery

Buildings
 Nationwide Arena, a multipurpose arena in Columbus, Ohio, US

See also
 Nationwide League (disambiguation)